Scott Fredericks (born Frederick Wehrly; 15 March 1943 – 6 November 2017) was an Irish actor best known for his roles on British television.

Early life
Fredericks was born in Strandhill, County Sligo to Edward Wehrly (d. 2001), a jewellery businessman (Wehrly Bros Limited) of German descent, and Ann (née Shaw).

He left Sligo when he won a scholarship to train at RADA in London, and later adopted the name Scott Fredericks.

Career
Scott Fredericks began his acting career with stage roles at the Chesterfield Repertory. He later worked with director Peter Brook and appeared in West End theatre productions of Antony and Cleopatra (as Mark Antony) and in Becket (as Henry II of England).

After appearing in the television soap opera Crossroads, Scott Fredericks went on to appear in a number of British television programmes in the 1960s, 70s and  1980s, including Z-Cars, Sutherland's Law, Dixon of Dock Green, Blake's 7 (episode "Weapon"), and Triangle. He made two appearances in the Doctor Who, in the serials Day of the Daleks (as Boaz) and Image of the Fendahl (as Max Stael). He also appeared in a 1981 episode of the ITV television police drama, Cribb ("The Hand That Rocks the Cradle") playing Prince Henry of Battenberg.

Fredericks also appeared in such feature films as Dad's Army (1971), See No Evil (1971) and Cal (1984). Whilst working in cinema productions, he once played a game of billiards with Fred Astaire. More recently, he appeared as a regular character in the Irish soap Fair City, as well as spending his time as a radio producer and director in his native Ireland.

Fredericks's stage career included leading roles in the Gate Theatre, Dublin, a long run of Peg o’ My Heart by J. Hartley Manners, and in stage adaptations of Cal and Caught in a Free State with the newly created Irish Theatre Company. For his solo stage show Yeats Remembers Fredericks was awarded the J.J. Finnegan Evening Herald Award in 1980.

Filmography

Death
Fredericks suffered from smoking-related illnesses and toward the end of his life had undergone a lung lobectomy and suffered from an aneurysm. Fredericks died in 2017 at Sligo University Hospital in Ireland. His funeral was held at Cathedral of the Immaculate Conception, Sligo and he was buried in Sligo Cemetery. Fredericks was survived by his two sons.

References

External links

1943 births
2017 deaths
Irish people of German descent
Irish male film actors
Irish male television actors
People from County Sligo